Street Guns is a South Korean rock and roll band formed in 2014.

Background
Formed in 2014, the band Street Guns consists of Tiger (박성호) and Roy (김경률) formerly from The RockTigers. They auditioned amateur vocalists and Chul-soo was chosen. They made their debut performance at the Club FF on March 1, 2014.

Discography

Studio albums
 Ordinary Band (2015)
 The Second Bullet(세컨뷸렛) (2019)

Current members

Tiger – Guitar 
Roy – Double bass 
kyu-kyu – Guitar  
Chul-soo – Vocals
In-sun 'the good boy' – Drum

Former members
Jeff – Drums

External links

References

South Korean indie rock groups
South Korean rock music groups
Musical groups established in 2014
2014 establishments in South Korea